The 2016 Austrian motorcycle Grand Prix was the tenth round of the 2016 MotoGP season. It was held at the Red Bull Ring in Spielberg on 14 August 2016.

MotoGP race report
Andrea Iannone took his first victory in MotoGP and the first since Moto2 Italy 2012 and also was the first Ducati rider other than Casey Stoner to win a race since Loris Capirossi's win at the 2007 Japanese Grand Prix. This race marked Ducati's first 1-2 finish since the 2007 Australian Grand Prix and also the first win for a manufacturer other than Honda or Yamaha since the 2010 Australian Grand Prix.

Classification

MotoGP

 Hector Barbera was black flagged for ignoring the jump start ride-through penalty.
 Jack Miller crashed during Sunday morning warm-up and suffered a broken right wrist & fractured vertebra.

Moto2

Moto3

 Romano Fenati was suspended by his VR46 team following disciplinary issues.

Championship standings after the race (MotoGP)
Below are the standings for the top five riders and constructors after round ten has concluded.

Riders' Championship standings

Constructors' Championship standings

 Note: Only the top five positions are included for both sets of standings.

References

2016 MotoGP race reports
Motorcycle Grand Prix
2016
Austrian motorcycle Grand Prix